Sajha Sawal was a weekly debate program broadcast across Nepal on radio and TV. The program was usually based on current affairs. In its eight years of broadcast, the program had been shot in 69 of the 75 districts of Nepal. Representatives of the different sections of society, related to the topic of debate are brought together during the program to discuss and find a solution to the issue. And as the name of the program speaks for itself, the program is an opportunity for people to raise questions and put them before the authorities.

Sajha Sawal was an immensely popular show among the Nepali community, reaching out to 6.6 million viewers, according to a research conducted by BBC Media Action. The show is appreciated for its impartial take on different social issues.

Narayan Shrestha was the first presenter of show. Since 2013 Bidhya Chapagain started to host the show.  Bidhya quit the show in December 2017 and started her own web series called Herne Katha.  The show was eventually closed in January 2018.

History

The program's first episode aired in November 2007. It began with the interview of former (late) Prime Minister Girija Prasad Koirala. The interview as shot in Koirala's hometown in Biratnagar. It was the first such program, where members of the public were allowed to ask questions to a sitting prime minister. Women, Dalits, and Muslims were able to directly ask questions on the peace process, constitution, election and other political issues.

See also

 BBC Nepali
 BBC Media Action

References

External links
 BBC profile 
 
 Website

Nepalese television series
BBC
2000s Nepalese television series
2010s Nepalese television series
Nepalese television talk shows
2007 Nepalese television series debuts